Joseph Clancy may refer to:

 Joseph Clancy (Secret Service) (born 1955), American law enforcement official
 Joseph Clancy (politician) (1890–1970), American businessman and politician in Wisconsin
 Joseph Clancy (Medal of Honor) (1863–1929), United States Navy sailor and Medal of Honor recipient
 Joe Clancy (born 1990), American football quarterback